"Liza Jane" is a song co-written and recorded by American country music artist Vince Gill.  It was released in June 1991 as the second single from the album Pocket Full of Gold.  The song reached number 7 on the Billboard Hot Country Singles & Tracks chart.  It was written by Gill and Reed Nielsen.

Music video
The music video was directed by John Lloyd Miller and premiered in mid-1991. The video shoot was planned to take place on the grounds of the Broadway Drive-In, located in Dickson, Tennessee, but per the introduction to the music video it had been rained out. Instead the video was filmed inside the concession stand of the drive in theater.

Personnel
Compiled from the liner notes.
Eddie Bayers – drums
Barry Beckett – piano
Vince Gill – lead vocals, electric guitar
Mac McAnally – acoustic guitar
Billy Thomas – backing vocals
Billy Joe Walker Jr. – electric guitar
Pete Wasner – keyboards 
Willie Weeks – bass guitar 
Andrea Zonn – fiddle

Chart performance

Year-end charts

References

1991 singles
Vince Gill songs
Songs written by Vince Gill
Songs written by Reed Nielsen
Song recordings produced by Tony Brown (record producer)
MCA Records singles
Music videos directed by John Lloyd Miller
1990 songs